The Philippine Athletics Track and Field Association (PATAFA) is the National Sports Association (NSA) for athletics sports such as track and field, road running, cross country running, and racewalking in the Philippines, including the core athletics sports which constitute the Decathlon in the Olympic Games.  PATAFA is also a member of the Asian Athletics Association (AAA) and the World Athletics.

Background
Jose C. Sering served as president from 1969 to 1981 and from 1984 to 1991. He resigned from his PATAFA post in 1990.

Go Teng Kok served as president from 1990 to 2014. Then known as “GTK’s Army,” Filipino track and field athletes won six gold medals in the 2013 Indonesia Southeast Asian Games, the most by any team in the games.

Philip Ella Juico was elected president of PATAFA in November 2014 and in a second election held on March 25, 2015, with POC Vice President Joey Romasanta as observer.

In 2015 the Philippine Olympic Committee (POC) formally recognized the NSA after PATAFA met compliance with several requirements such as an updated constitution, by-laws and inclusion of the true stakeholders of the sport.

Juico was re-elected as president of PATAFA in November 2021. He resigned on June 18, 2022, and was replaced by Terry Capistrano.

PATAFA was formerly known as the Philippine Amateur Track and Field Association, or simply Athletics Philippines.

Board

As of June 2022, PATAFA's board consists of the president and seventeen members.

 President Terry Capistrano
 Chairman Rufus Rodriguez, congressman of the second district of Cagayan de Oro
 Honorary Chairman Senator Christoher Lawrence “Bong” Go
 Secretary-General Rommel Sytin, president of United Asia Automotive Group, Inc. and Foton Motor Philippines, Inc.
 Executive Vice President Agapito Capistrano
 Corporate Secretary Atty. Melinda Diaz-Salcedo, Director Philippine Superliga, Inc.
 Treasurer Noel Silva, Engineer
 Auditor Elmer Ngo
 Trustee Dr. Benjamin Espiritu, former Oriental Mindoro governor
 Trustee Felix O. Tiukinhoy Jr., Cebu businessman
 Trustee Josemarie Diaz, Ilagan City Mayor
 Trustee Rafaelito Villavicencio, sportsman
 Trustee Joseph Anton Bengzon
 Trustee Jaime Villegas
 Trustee Datu Yusoph Mama
 Trustee Dr. Guillermo Torres Jr.
 Trustee Atty. Roberto Uy
 Trustee Go Teng Kok, former PATAFA president

See also
 Ernest John Obiena–PATAFA dispute

References

External links
Philippine Amateur Track and Field Association OFFICIAL WEBSITE
Philippine Amateur Track and Field Association profile at the Philippine Olympic Committee website
Pinoyathletics Website
PATAFA Bylaws (2015)

Sports organizations established in 1962
Athletics in the Philippines
Athletics
National members of the International Association of Athletics Federations